Shannon Tarbet (born 27 October 1991) is a British actress who has transitioned from an extensive career in theatre to feature film with main roles in Love Is Blind (2019) and Love Sarah (2020), and on television with recurring roles in Genius and in Rellik (2017) and as Amber Peel in Killing Eve (2019).

Early life
Tarbet was born and lived her early years in Brighton, East Sussex, and attended Greenfields School in Forest Row. Tarbet studied acting at the K-Bis Theatre School in Brighton. From there, Tarbet was working in telesales attempting to save enough money to apply for drama school, when she successfully auditioned at the Royal Court Theatre, igniting her acting career.

Career
Tarbet made her professional stage debut in 2010 as Delilah Evans in the Anya Reiss play Spur of the Moment at the Royal Court Theatre, for which, she was shortlisted for the Evening Standard Outstanding Newcomer in 2010.  In 2011, she made a guest appearance in the BBC's Inspector George Gently.  In 2012, she appeared as Jane Clairmont in Helen Edmundson's play, Mary Shelley. The same year, Tarbet played a voice role in Nell Leyshon's radio drama Jess's Story, for Children in need, aired on BBC Radio 4 in November 2012, concerning students with mental health issues.

In 2013, Tarbet appeared in the short film Woodland and won the best actor award at the Underwire Film Festival. In 2015, Tarbet was nominated for an Offie award for best female for her performance the play, The Edge of our Bodies at the Gate Theatre (London). In 2017, Tarbet starred alongside Geoffrey Rush in the Ron Howard directed Genius. The same year Tarbet played sixteen year-old Hannah Markham in the BBC drama TV series Rellik.

In 2019, Tarbet starred alongside Matthew Broderick in the dark comedy-drama film Love is Blind. 

In 2020, Tarbet played the leading role of Clarissa in Love Sarah, directed by Eliza Schroeder.

In 2022, Tarbet starred in an interactive film, the first of its kind in Europe, The Gallery

Stage performances

Filmography

Film

Television

Awards and nominations

References

External links
 
 

21st-century English actresses
Actresses from Brighton
Actresses from Sussex
British film actresses
British stage actresses
British television actresses
Living people
1991 births